was a Japanese football player. He played for Japan national team. His brother Masao Nozawa also played for Japan national team.

National team career
Nozawa was born in Hiroshima Prefecture. In May 1934, when he was a Waseda University student, he was selected Japan national team for 1934 Far Eastern Championship Games in Manila. At this competition, on May 13, he debuted against Dutch East Indies. He also played against Philippines and Republic of China. He played 3 games and scored 3 goals for Japan in 1934.

National team statistics

References

External links
 
 Japan National Football Team Database

1914 births
2000 deaths
Waseda University alumni
Association football people from Hiroshima Prefecture
Japanese footballers
Japan international footballers
Association football forwards